Patryk Stępiński (born 16 January 1995) is a Polish professional footballer who plays as a full-back for Widzew Łódź.

Club career
On 1 September 2020 he returned to Widzew Łódź.

References

External links
 
 

1995 births
Living people
Footballers from Łódź
Polish footballers
Poland youth international footballers
Association football defenders
Widzew Łódź players
Wisła Płock players
Warta Poznań players
Ekstraklasa players
I liga players